Events in the year 1611 in Norway.

Incumbents
Monarch: Christian IV

Events
April - The Kalmar War starts.
Summer - Swedish forces under Baltzar Bäck invades Jemtland and Herjedalen.

Arts and literature

Births

26 October - Ove Bjelke, Chancellor of Norway (died 1674).

Deaths

See also

References